El Silbón (The Whistler) is a legendary figure in Colombia and Venezuela, associated especially with Los Llanos region, usually described as a lost soul. The legend arose in the middle of the 19th century.

Legend
Another more disturbing version states this son was a “spoiled brat” whose parents catered to every wish. One afternoon he demands his father hunt for a deer--his favorite meat. But when the father does not find a deer and returns empty-handed, his son kills him and cuts out his heart and liver. He then has his mother cook them for dinner.

The mother finding this meat is tough starts to suspect something is amiss. She discovers these organs are her own husband’s innards and curses her son for eternity. Afterwards, his grandfather ordered the youth to be tied to a post in the middle of the countryside and lashed him until his back was destroyed. His wounds were then cleaned with alcohol, chili peppers, and lemon juice, a sack full of his father’s remains was placed on his wounded back, and he was released with his grandfather’s two rabid, starving dogs set upon him. Before releasing him, his grandfather condemned him to carry the bones of his father for all eternity.

It has a characteristic whistle that resembles the musical notes C, D, E, F, G, A, and B in that order. Rising in tone to F, then lowering to B. It is said that when the whistling sounds close, there's no danger, and the whistler is far away, but when the whistling sounds distant, it means it is nearby. It is also said that hearing the whistling foretells one's own death, and one may hear it anywhere at any time. In this situation, the only thing that can save the victim is the sound of a dog barking (as it is the only thing it is afraid of), a chili, or a whip. The spirit tends to take revenge on womanizers.

Many inhabitants of Los Llanos say that they have seen it, primarily in the summer, a time when the Venezuelan savannah burns in the harsh drought. The Whistler sits in the trees and gathers dust in his hands. But it is mainly on rainy or humid days that the spirit wanders, hungry for death, and eager to punish drunkards, womanizers, or sometimes innocent victims. It is said that it sucks the alcohol out of drunkards through their navel when it finds them alone and that it tears womanizers to pieces, removes their bones, and puts them in the sack where it keeps the remains of his father.

Some versions say it appears as a giant of about six meters that moves about the treetops, creaking, and emitting its chilling whistle. Inside its old and tattered sack lie the bones of its father, or according to some renditions, its multiple victims. Other versions say he appears as the shadow of a tall thin man, with a hat, and goes after drunkards most of all.

They say that the whistler can appear by a house on certain nights, drop his sack on the ground and count the bones one by one. If one hears it, nothing will happen, but if someone doesn't hear it before dawn, one person in your home will die.

See also
 Sack man
 Coco (folklore)
 La Llorona
 Madam Koi Koi
 Sayona
 Cadejo
 Slender Man

References

Venezuelan legends
Colombian legends
Colombian folklore
Ghosts
Latin American folklore
Mythology of the Americas
South American mythology
Spanish-language South American legendary creatures
Myths and legends of Colombia